Alfred Jeffrey Lloyd (born 29 July 1914 in Birmingham, England) was a former international speedway rider who qualified for the Speedway World Championship finals three times.

Career summary
Lloyd, whose elder brother Wally Lloyd also rode, took up speedway in 1936, first riding at Wembley before gaining further experience at Birmingham, before signing with Bristol Bulldogs. When speedway resumed in 1945 he returned, and was one of the top riders in the Northern League in 1946. He joined the Newcastle Diamonds in 1946, and finished the season averaging over ten points per match in the Northern League. 

In 1947 it was expected that he would be signed by a higher division team but he started the season with the Diamonds. A few weeks into the season, the New Cross Rangers signed Lloyd for a transfer fee of 1,000 (at the time the highest transfer fee in British speedway), with Ken Le Breton transferring in the opposite direction. By then end of the next season, he had won the National League championship.

Lloyd was selected to represent England in the test series against Australia in the 1948 Ashes series.

1950 saw Lloyd start the season with the Rangers but midway through the season he was transferred to the Harringay Racers, a move that was not popular with the New Cross fans. Whilst with the Racers he qualified for the Speedway World Championship final three times and was a member of the team that won the National Trophy in 1952.

When the Racers closed down at the end of 1954, Lloyd retired.

World final appearances
 1951 –  London, Wembley Stadium: 11th (6 pts)
 1952 –  London, Wembley Stadium: 8th (7 pts)
 1953 –  London, Wembley Stadium: 7th (8 pts)

References

1914 births
1997 deaths
British speedway riders
English motorcycle racers
Bristol Bulldogs riders
Newcastle Diamonds riders
New Cross Rangers riders
Harringay Racers riders